Garri is a popular West African food made from cassava tubers.

Garri may also refer to:
 Garri (given name), a masculine given name
 Garri, Iran, a village in Iran
 Luca Garri (born 1982), Italian basketball player

See also

 Gari (disambiguation)
 Gerri (disambiguation)
 Garry (disambiguation)
 Jarri